Pampacocha (possibly from Quechua pampa a large plain, qucha lake, "plain lake") is a lake in the south of the Huallanca mountain range in the Andes of Peru. Pampacocha is located in the Ancash Region, Bolognesi Province, Huallanca District, near a lake named Suerococha.

References 

Lakes of Peru
Lakes of Ancash Region